von der Leyen most commonly refers to Ursula von der Leyen, German politician and President of the European Commission. It may also mean:

House of Leyen, a German noble family
Fürst von der Leyen und zu Hohengeroldseck, a noble title held by the family
Principality of Leyen, a Napoleonic state 
 Ursula von der Leyen, the President of the European Commission
Von der Leyen (family from Krefeld), originally a family of silk merchants

See also

 Leyens (disambiguation)
 Leye (disambiguation)
 Ley (disambiguation)
 
 Von (disambiguation)
 Der (disambiguation)